Papallacta stenoptera is a species of fly in the family Dolichopodidae, and the only member of the genus Papallacta. It was described from mossy páramo habitat near 4000m in the Andes of Ecuador. The genus is named after the Papallacta region. The species name, stenoptera, is derived from the Greek for "narrow wing", referring to the narrow, reduced wings of the species.

References

Medeterinae
Diptera of South America
Endemic fauna of Ecuador
Invertebrates of Ecuador
Insects described in 2006